Yoon Hye-young (born March 15, 1977) is a South Korean archer and Olympic champion. She competed at the 1996 Summer Olympics in Atlanta, where she won a gold medal with the South Korean archery team.

References

External links
 

1977 births
Living people
South Korean female archers
Olympic archers of South Korea
Archers at the 1996 Summer Olympics
Olympic gold medalists for South Korea
Olympic medalists in archery
Medalists at the 1996 Summer Olympics
South Korean Buddhists
20th-century South Korean women